Can't Believe It refers to:

Can't Believe It (T-Pain song), 2008
Can't Believe It (Flo Rida song), 2013
"Can't Believe It", a song by Kid Cudi from the 2022 album Entergalactic
"Can't Believe It", a song by Manfred Mann from the 1964 album The Five Faces of Manfred Mann
"Can't Believe It", a song by Pere Ubu from the 1981 album 390° of Simulated Stereo
"Can't Believe It", a song by Pennywise from the 1999 album Straight Ahead

See also
I Can't Believe It (disambiguation)